The edition notice (or copyright page) is the page in a book containing information about the current edition, usually on the back of the title page.  It often contains a copyright notice, legal notices, publication information, printing history, cataloguing information from a national library, and an ISBN that uniquely identifies the work.

At the bottom of the edition notice one often finds a line of numbers, some of which may appear to be missing, called the printer's key.  These indicate the book's print run.

Sometimes, there will also be a warning indicating that the book sold without a cover is a stripped book.

See also
Colophon (publishing)
Impressum

References

Copyright law
Book publishing